Jerome Solon Felder (June 27, 1925 – March 14, 1991), known professionally as Doc Pomus, was an American blues singer and songwriter. He is best known as the co-writer of many rock and roll hits. Pomus was inducted into the Rock and Roll Hall of Fame as a non-performer in 1992, the Songwriters Hall of Fame (1992), and the Blues Hall of Fame (2012).

Early life
Born Jerome Solon Felder in 1925 in Williamsburg, Brooklyn, New York, he was the son of Jewish immigrants. He attended Brooklyn College from 1943 to 1945. Felder became a fan of the blues after hearing a Big Joe Turner record, "Piney Brown Blues". Having contracted polio as a boy, he walked with the aid of crutches. Later, due to post-polio syndrome exacerbated by an accident, Felder relied on a wheelchair.

His brother is New York attorney Raoul Felder.

Career
Using the stage name Doc Pomus, teenager Felder began performing as a blues singer. His stage name was not inspired by anyone in particular; he just thought it sounded better for a blues singer than Jerry Felder. Pomus stated that more often than not, he was the only Caucasian in the clubs, but that as a Jew with polio, he felt a special underdog kinship with African Americans, while in turn the audiences respected his courage and were impressed by his talent. Gigging at clubs in and around New York City, Pomus often performed with Milt Jackson, Mickey Baker, and King Curtis. Pomus recorded about forty sides as a singer in the 1940s and 1950s for Chess, Apollo, Dawn, Gotham, and other recording companies.

In the early 1950s, Pomus began writing magazine articles, as well as songwriting for Lavern Baker, Ruth Brown, Ray Charles, and Big Joe Turner. In 1957 he married an aspiring Broadway actress from Westville, Illinois, named Willi Burke. They were divorced in 1966. His first songwriting break came when the Coasters recorded a hit with the song "Young Blood", although the melody had been radically changed by Jerry Leiber and Mike Stoller. Still, Pomus had co-credit as lyricist, and soon received a royalty check for $2,500 (US$ in  dollars), an event that convinced him that songwriting was a career worth pursuing. By 1957, Pomus had given up performing in favor of songwriting.

Pomus collaborated with pianist Mort Shuman, whom he met when Shuman was dating Pomus's younger cousin. Songwriter Otis Blackwell introduced the duo to Hill & Range Music Co./Rumbalero Music at its offices in New York City's Brill Building. Pomus asked Shuman to write with him because Pomus did not know much about contemporary rock and roll, whereas Shuman was acquainted with popular artists of the day. For the most part, Pomus wrote the lyrics while Shuman composed the melodies, but they often collaborated on both aspects of their songs. Together they wrote "A Teenager in Love", "Save The Last Dance For Me", "Hushabye", "This Magic Moment", "Turn Me Loose", "Sweets For My Sweet" (a hit for The Drifters, and later The Searchers), "Go, Jimmy, Go", "Little Sister", "Can't Get Used to Losing You", "Suspicion", "Surrender", and "(Marie's the Name of) His Latest Flame".

During the late 1950s and early 1960s, Pomus wrote several songs with Phil Spector ("Young Boy Blues", "Ecstasy", "First Taste of Love" and "What Am I To Do?"), Mike Stoller and Jerry Leiber ("Young Blood" and "She's Not You"), and other Brill Building-era writers. Pomus also wrote "Lonely Avenue", a 1956 hit for Ray Charles.

In the 1970s and 1980s, in his eleventh-floor, two-room apartment at the Westover Hotel at 253 West 72nd Street, Pomus wrote songs with Dr. John, Ken Hirsch, and Willy DeVille for what he said were "... those people stumbling around in the night out there, uncertain or not always so certain of exactly where they fit in and where they were headed." These later songs ("There Must Be A Better World", "There Is Always One More Time", "That World Outside", "You Just Keep Holding On", and "Something Beautiful Dying")—recorded by Willy DeVille, B.B. King, Irma Thomas, Marianne Faithfull, Charlie Rich, Ruth Brown, Dr. John, James Booker, and Johnny Adams—are considered by some, including writer Peter Guralnick, musician and songwriter Dr. John, and producer Joel Dorn, to be signatures of Pomus's best craft.

The documentary film A.K.A. Doc Pomus (2012), conceived by Pomus's daughter Sharyn Felder, directed by filmmaker Peter Miller, edited by Amy Linton, and produced by Felder, Hechter, and Miller, presents Pomus's biography.

Pomus died on March 14, 1991, of lung cancer at the age of 65 at NYU Medical Center in Manhattan.

Legacy and influence

Together with Shuman, and individually, Pomus was a key figure in the development of popular music. The duo co-wrote such hits as "A Teenager in Love", "Save the Last Dance for Me", "This Magic Moment", "Sweets for My Sweet", "Viva Las Vegas", "Little Sister", "Surrender", "Can't Get Used to Losing You", "Suspicion", "Turn Me Loose" and "A Mess of Blues". 
Pomus was elected to the Songwriters Hall of Fame and the Rock and Roll Hall of Fame.
In 1991 he was the first non-African American recipient of the Rhythm and Blues Foundation Pioneer Award. Ray Charles presented the award via a pre-recorded message.
The funk band Cameo was heavily influenced by Pomus's song-writing style and frequently acknowledges his impact before performing their hit song "Word Up."
Longtime friend, jazz singer Jimmy Scott, performed at Pomus's funeral, a performance that resurrected his career. Other attendees included Seymour Stein, who subsequently signed Scott to Sire Records, and Lou Reed, who thereafter would regularly work with Scott until his death. Pomus had been imploring his friends to hear Scott sing for many years.
The song "Doc's Blues" was written as a tribute to Pomus by his close friend, Andrew Vachss. The lyrics originally appeared in Vachss's 1990 novel Blossom. "Doc's Blues" was recorded by bluesman Son Seals on Seals's last album, Lettin' Go.
Responsible for Lou Reed's introduction to the music industry in the early 1960s, Pomus was one of two friends Reed memorialized on his 1992 album Magic and Loss (the other was "Rita," he did not elaborate with a last name—some speculate it was his close friend Rachel Humphreys (who died in 1990—it was not "Rotten Rita" who lived until 2010).
In 1995, Rhino Records released a tribute album to Pomus titledTill The Night Is Gone. Pomus's songs are performed by Bob Dylan, Brian Wilson, Dion, Dr. John, Irma Thomas, Solomon Burke, John Hiatt, Shawn Colvin, Aaron Neville, Lou Reed, The Band, B.B. King, Los Lobos, and Rosanne Cash.
In 2010, Ben Folds and Nick Hornby named their collaborative album on which the song "Doc Pomus" appeared Lonely Avenue. The lyrics referenced an excerpt from Pomus's unfinished memoir, February 21, 1984: "I was never one of those happy cripples who stumbled around smiling and shiny-eyed, trying to get the world to cluck its tongue and shake its head sadly in my direction. They'd never look at me and say, 'What a wonderful, courageous fellow.'" The album featured lyrics by British author Hornby, set to music by American performer Folds. It was released on September 28, 2010.
John Goodman's character in the Coen brothers' 2013 dramedy Inside Llewyn Davis was loosely inspired by Pomus. Pomus's song catalog  is managed by his son-in-law, Will Bratton, through Warner Chappell Music, Inc. as of January 1, 2021.
Songs written or co-written by Doc Pomus have been recorded by Joe Cocker, ZZ Top, Ray Charles, Elvis Presley, Elvis Costello, Dean Martin, Andy Williams, The Beatles, Bad Company, Leonard Cohen, Van Morrison, Led Zeppelin, Bruce Springsteen, Michael Buble, Dolly Parton, Emmy Lou Harris, Bob Dylan, Brian Wilson, Harry Nilsson, John Hiatt, The Beach Boys, B.B. King, The New York Dolls, Shawn Colvin, Los Lobos, Dion and hundreds of others.
Bob Dylan's 2022 Book,The Philosophy of Modern Song, is dedicated to Doc Pomus.

Further reading

References

External links
The Official Home Page of Pomus Songs, Inc.
[ Doc Pomus] at AllMusic
 
 
Doc Pomus Biography
Doc Pomus and Mort Shuman
 Entries at repertoire.bmi.com

1925 births
1991 deaths
American blues singers
Songwriters from New York (state)
Jewish American musicians
Jewish American songwriters
Musicians from Brooklyn
Chess Records artists
People from Williamsburg, Brooklyn
20th-century American singers
People with polio
Jewish rock musicians
Burials at Beth David Cemetery
Deaths from lung cancer in New York (state)
20th-century American male singers
20th-century American Jews
American male songwriters
Blues rock musicians